Georgetown Junior/Senior High School (formerly Georgetown High School) is a public high school in Georgetown, Ohio, United States.  It is the only high school in the Georgetown Exempted Village School district.

Ohio High School Athletic Association State Championships

 Boys Cross Country – 1969
 Boys Basketball - 2007

References

External links
 District website

High schools in Brown County, Ohio
Public high schools in Ohio